Manzelabad may refer to:
 Manzelabad, Ardabil
 Manzelabad, Kerman
 Manzelabad, Razavi Khorasan